Herleva ( 1003 – c. 1050) was an 11th-century Norman woman known for having been mother of William the Conqueror, born to an extramarital relationship with Robert I, Duke of Normandy, and also of William's prominent half-brothers Odo of Bayeux and Robert, Count of Mortain, born to Herleva's marriage to Herluin de Conteville.

Life
Herleva's background and the circumstances of William's birth are shrouded in mystery. The written evidence dates from a generation or two later, and is not entirely consistent, but of all the Norman chroniclers only the Tours chronicler and William of Malmesbury, the latter thought to have simply copied the Tours source, assert that William's parents were subsequently joined in marriage. According to Edward Augustus Freeman, the Tours chronicler's version cannot be true, because if Herleva married the Duke, then William's birth would have been legitimized, and thus he would not have been known as William the Bastard by his contemporaries. 

The earliest source to refer to Herleva's origin is the early-12th-century additions made by Norman chronicler Orderic Vitalis to the Gesta Normannorum Ducum, where Herleva's father is named as Fulbert, who would become the Duke's Chamberlain (cubicularii ducis). Orderic reports the birth of William as occurring at Falaise, in Normandy, presumed to be Herleva's native town, apparently during its 1026/7. 

In a separate addition to the Gesta, Orderic relates an anecdote that has given rise to Fulbert being characterized with more humble origins, as a tanner. During his siege of Alençon, the townspeople are said to have called William peliciarius (pelterer) because his mother's kinsmen had been pollinctors. The latter is a rarely-used word, and two late-12th century poets, Wace and Benoît de Sainte-Maure, translate it differently, as parmentier (skinner/furrier/tanner) and peletier (tailor), respectively. An alternative suggested reading of pollinctors would see Fulbert as an embalmer, apothecary, or a person who laid out corpses for burial, the latter perhaps in turn an allusion to the court official who supervised that process, the chamberlain. Indirect evidence suggests that Herleva's father was not a lowly tanner but, rather, a member of the burgher class. Her brothers appear in a later document as attestors for an under-age William. Also, the Count of Flanders accepted Herleva as a proper guardian for his own daughter. Both of these would have been nearly impossible had Herleva's father only been a mere tanner, which would place his social standing little above that of a peasant.

According to one legend, her relationship with Robert began when he saw Herleva from the roof of his castle tower. The walkway on the roof still looks down on the dyeing trenches cut into stone in the courtyard below, which can be seen to this day from the tower ramparts above. The traditional way of dyeing leather or garments was to trample barefoot on the garments which were awash in the liquid dye in these trenches. Herleva, legend goes, seeing the Duke on his ramparts above, raised her skirts perhaps a bit more than necessary in order to attract the Duke's eye. The latter was immediately smitten and ordered her brought in (as was customary for any woman that caught the Duke's eye) through the back door. Herleva refused, saying she would only enter the Duke's castle on horseback through the front gate, and not as an ordinary commoner. The Duke, filled with lust, could only agree. In a few days, Herleva, dressed in the finest her father could provide, and sitting on a white horse, rode proudly through the front gate, her head held high. This gave Herleva a semi-official status as the Duke's concubine. She later gave birth to his son, William, in 1027 or 1028.

Marriage to Herluin de Conteville

Herleva later married Herluin de Conteville in 1031. Some accounts maintain that Robert always loved her, but the gap in their social status made marriage impossible, so, to give her a good life, he married her off to one of his favourite noblemen.

From her marriage to Herluin she had two sons: Odo, who later became Bishop of Bayeux, and Robert, who became Count of Mortain. Both became prominent during William's reign. They also had at least two daughters: Emma, who married Richard le Goz, Viscount of Avranches, and a daughter of unknown name who married William, lord of la Ferté-Macé.

Death 

According to Robert of Torigni, Herleva was buried at the abbey of Grestain, which was founded by Herluin and their son Robert around 1050. This would put Herleva in her forties around the time of her death.

Notes

Sources

References

External links
 Life of Harlette, or Herleva, mother of William the Conqueror (with images)

1000s births
1050 deaths

Year of birth uncertain
Year of death uncertain
Norman women
11th-century French women
11th-century French people
William the Conqueror
11th-century Normans
11th-century Norman women
Concubines